Pamela Druckerman is an American-French writer and journalist living in Paris, France. In fall 2013, she became a contributing opinion writer for The New York Times International Edition.

Education and early life
Pamela Druckerman grew up in Miami where her "life plan elegantly combined the city’s worship of bodies and money, and its indifference to how you came by either."

She received a bachelor's degree in philosophy from Colgate University and a master's in international affairs from Columbia University's School of International and Public Affairs in 1998.

From 1997 to 2002 she was a staff reporter at The Wall Street Journal based in Buenos Aires, Argentina; São Paulo, Brazil; and New York, covering economics and politics. She has also reported from Tokyo, Japan; Moscow, Russia; Johannesburg, South Africa; and Jerusalem, Israel. Previously she was a Council on Foreign Relations term member and performed improv comedy with the Upright Citizens Brigade.

She became a naturalised French citizen in 2017.

Writing
Druckerman is best known as the author of Bringing Up Bébé: One American Mother Discovers the Wisdom of French Parenting, a book about French parenting philosophy and tips published by Penguin in 2012.  It was published in the United Kingdom as French Children Don't Throw Food by Doubleday.

She also published Lust In Translation: Infidelity from Tokyo to Tennessee in 2007 with Penguin Group that examined the nature of marital infidelity. She claims that North America is the worst place to have an extramarital affair, because of the high degree of honesty Americans expect from their partners, and observed that the French have a much more understanding and permissive attitude towards adultery.

Her latest book is published in 2018 and it is a portrait of modern middle age called There Are No Grown-Ups: A Midlife Coming-of-Age Story, which Kirkus Reviews called “a trenchant and witty book on maturity and ‘middle-age shock.’”

Her op-eds and articles have appeared in The New York Times, The Washington Post, Marie Claire, The Guardian, and Monocle. She also appears on news shows, including Good Morning America, the Today show, National Public Radio,<ref>Interview on NPR's Morning Edition', August 27, 2007.</ref> and BBC. Druckerman was nominated as one of Time'' 100 most influential people of 2012.

References

External links 
 
@pameladruck Twitter account

Living people
School of International and Public Affairs, Columbia University alumni
American investigative journalists
American women journalists
American emigrants to France
Colgate University alumni
The Wall Street Journal people
21st-century American women writers
21st-century American non-fiction writers
Writers from Miami
Year of birth missing (living people)